Arthur "Art" Shapiro  is an American vision scientist and creator of visual illusions. He is the co-editor of the Oxford Compendium of Visual Illusions.  He is currently a professor of psychology and computer science with the American University in Washington, D.C. and Director of the Collaborative for Applied Perceptual Research and Innovation (CAPRI).

Research and recognition
Shapiro completed his undergraduate work in mathematics and psychology at U.C. San Diego. He received his PhD in psychology from Columbia University and completed post-doctoral research at the University of Chicago, working with Joel Pokorny and Vivianne C. Smith in the Department of Ophthalmology and Visual Sciences. His research focuses on color, motion, vision in low-light environments, and visual phenomena.

Shapiro's work on motion perception has been featured in news articles, television programming, and viral videos. CuriosityStream (an on-demand streaming service) produced a five-part series on visual illusions of which Shapiro was the narrator and presenter. The New York Times and NPR have each written pieces examining Shapiro's contributions to vision science and motion illusions (e.g. an analysis of the curve ball illusion). The National Geographic program Brain Games utilized Shapiro as a "Motion Expert" to explore human vision and the neuroscience behind several popular motion illusions. Similarly, both USA Today and NBC Washington have featured Shapiro's scientific analysis of #thedress. Shapiro has also been featured on the YouTube channel "Illusions and Science", exhibiting his "Tusi or Not Tusi" motion illusion  Shapiro was also featured on several episodes of New England Sport's Network (NESN)'s Baseball Lab.

In 2014, Shapiro was selected to be a member of "The Nifty Fifty", a group of international professionals organized by the USA Science and Engineering Festival to promote the STEM fields to secondary school students across the United States. Other members of the "Nifty Fifty" include Elon Musk (of Tesla Motors and SpaceX), Michael Shermer (of Skeptic), and Sylvester James Gates.

Shapiro was selected as a top-ten finalist to the Best Illusion of the Year Contest twelve times. He has received the first place prize twice. Each of the selected entries are listed and referenced below.

References

1964 births
Living people
American University faculty and staff
21st-century American psychologists
University of California, San Diego alumni
Columbia University alumni
Vision scientists
20th-century American psychologists